The Northern Indochina subtropical moist forests are a subtropical moist broadleaf forest ecoregion of northern Indochina, covering portions of Vietnam, Laos, Thailand, Myanmar, and China's Yunnan Province.

Setting
The Northern Indochina subtropical forests occupy the highlands of northern Indochina, extending from northeastern Vietnam, where they cover the upper portion of the Red River watershed and the northern Annamite Range, across northern Laos, northernmost Thailand, and southeastern Yunnan to Shan State in eastern Myanmar. The ecoregion includes Fan Si Pan, Vietnam's highest mountain.

The Northern Indochina subtropical forests are a transition between the tropical forests of Indochina and the subtropical and temperate forests of China and the Tibetan Plateau.

Climate
The ecoregion has a subtropical monsoon climate. Rainfall is highly seasonal, falling mostly with the summer monsoon from the Bay of Bengal and South China Sea between April and October. From November to March westerly winds from continental Asia create cooler and dry conditions. January is the coldest month, and pre-monsoon spring temperatures are generally the hottest. Mean temperatures are generally lower as elevation increases, and infrequent frosts occur at higher elevations.

Flora
The predominant plant community is subtropical broadleaf evergreen forest. These forests include a mix of subtropical plants common to the Himalayas and southern China, along with tropical lowland forest species. Trees from the plant families Theaceae (Schima spp.), Magnoliaceae (Michelia spp., Magnolia spp.), and Fagaceae (Quercus spp., Castanopsis spp., and Lithocarpus spp.) are predominant. Other tree families represented are Betulaceae, Hamamelidaceae, Lauraceae, Sapotaceae, and Elaeocarpaceae.

Montane broadleaf evergreen forests occur from  elevation up to  elevation. The subtropical montane species are predominant, and the tropical lowland species are absent. Deciduous broadleaf trees and conifers are found at higher elevations. Montane deciduous forests are found on the Shan Plateau of northern Myanmar.

On Fan Si Pan in northern Vietnam, a distinct fir-hemlock forest grows above  elevation, and is found nowhere else in Southeast Asia. The characteristic trees are the conifers Tsuga dumosa and Abies delavayi var. nukiangensis. The firs and hemlocks are accompanied by broadleaf trees of families Aceraceae, Hippocastanaceae, Fagaceae, Magnoliaceae, and Lauraceae, and conifers of Cupressaceae, Podocarpaceae, and Taxaceae.

Forests growing on limestone substrates have a distinct composition, with the trees Tetrameles nudiflora, Antiaris toxicaria, Celtis cinnamomifolia, C. wightii, Cleistanthus sumatranus, Garuga floribunda, Pterospermum menglunense, Ulmus lanceaefolia, and Xantolis stenopetala.

Fauna
The ecoregion is home to over 183 species of mammals. They include the Asian elephant (Elephas maxiumus), tiger (Panthera tigris), Asian black bear (Ursus thibetanus), gaur (Bos gaurus), mainland serow (Capricornis sumatraensis milneedwardsii), banteng (Bos javanicus), clouded leopard (Pardofelis nebulosa), red panda (Ailurus fulgens), particoloured flying squirrel (Hylopetes alboniger), pygmy loris (Nycticebus pygmaeus), northern pig-tailed macaque (Macaca leonina), Assam macaque (Macaca assamensis), stump-tailed macaque (Macaca arctoides), dhole (Cuon alpinus), smooth-coated otter (Lutrogale perspicillata), back-striped weasel (Mustela strigidorsa), and inornate squirrel (Callosciurus inornatus).

Several mammals are endemic to the ecoregion – the Tonkin snub-nosed monkey (Rhinopithecus avunculus), northern white-cheeked gibbon (Hylobates leucogenys), Owston's palm civet (Chrotogale owstoni), Roosevelt's muntjac (Muntiacus rooseveltorum), and the Chaotung vole (Eothenomys olitor). Fea's muntjac (Muntiacus feae), Anderson's squirrel (Callosciurus quinquestriatus), and red-throated squirrel (Dremomys gularis'') are near-endemic species, native to the ecoregion and one or more adjacent ecoregions.

The ecoregion has 707 species of birds.

Protected areas
A 2017 assessment estimated that 30,724 km², or 7%, of the ecoregion is in protected areas. Another 34% of ecoregion's area is forested but outside of protected areas. A 1997 assessment found a total of 15,948 km² protected in 19 protected areas.

References

External links
 
 

Ecoregions of Asia
Ecoregions of China
Ecoregions of Laos
Ecoregions of Myanmar
Ecoregions of Thailand
Ecoregions of Vietnam

 

Forests of China
Forests of Myanmar
Forests of Vietnam
Indomalayan ecoregions
Tropical and subtropical moist broadleaf forests